Louis Messina  is an American concert promoter who is best known for promoting Taylor Swift and George Strait.

Early life 
Louis Messina's father was “Leapin’ Lou” Messina a New Orleans Boxing promoter. Living across the street from New Orleans’ Municipal Auditorium, Louis father took him to an Elvis Presley concert when he was 7 years old leading to his interest in music.

Music career 
In 1975 Louis co-founded PACE Concerts. Louis founded the annual summer rock concert series Texxas World Music Festival (1978–1988) Texxas Jam. It was held in Dallas at the Cotton Bowl, and in Houston, at either the Astrodome or Rice Stadium on the campus of Rice University. He also conceived of OzzFest with Sharon Osborne. Louis also promoted concerts in outdoor amphitheaters which reshaped the concert business. In 1997 Pace Concerts was bought by SFX. After SFX was sold to Clear Channel in 2000, Louis went out on his own to promote George Strait. His promotion of George Strait lead to his working with other artists including Taylor Swift and Ed Sheeran. Thru 2022 Louis has promoted shows grossing over $4.5 Billion. Louis received the Tony Martell Lifetime Entertainment Achievement Award. Louis also received the CMA Touring Lifetime Achievement Award.

References 

American entertainment industry businesspeople
American music industry executives
Music promoters
Year of birth missing (living people)
Living people